Manuel "Manolo" Jiménez Soria (born 12 August 1976) is an Andorran footballer. He currently plays for Santa Coloma and the Andorra national football team.

International statistics
Updated 28 September 2014."

International goalScores and results list Andorra's goal tally first.''

References

External links

1976 births
Living people
Andorran footballers
FC Andorra players
Andorra international footballers
FC Santa Coloma players
Association football midfielders
Primera Divisió players